RNR is the Royal Naval Reserve, the volunteer reserve force of the Royal Navy in the United Kingdom.

RNR may also refer to:
 Ribonucleotide reductase
 Rig 'n' Roll, a truck simulation adventure game
 Right node raising, in linguistics, a mechanism that sees parallel structures share material to their immediate right
 Royal Newfoundland Regiment, a regiment of the Canadian Army
 "RnR", a franchise of the FGL Sports
 R n R, an album by Richard Elliot and Rick Braun
the risk-need-responsivity model of offender treatment

See also
 R'n'r (disambiguation)
 R&R (disambiguation)